The Walaqa River is a tributary of the Blue Nile, is river in the Amhara Region of Ethiopia. Wegde is located to its north. Mida Woremo and Dera are to the south, while Kelala is to the northeast. The Walaqa River may have been the northern boundary of the historical province of Walaqa.

See also
List of Ethiopian rivers

References

External links
 Ethiopia Disaster Prevention and Preparedness Agency: Administrative atlas: Amhara region
 Ethiopia Disaster Prevention and Preparedness Agency: Flood Vulnerable Areas as of August 24, 2006

Tributaries of the Blue Nile
Rivers of Ethiopia
Amhara Region